Andrew Wingard (born December 5, 1996) is an American football safety for the Jacksonville Jaguars of the National Football League (NFL).  He played college football at Wyoming. He was signed as an undrafted free agent by Jacksonville after the 2019 NFL Draft.

College career 
Wingard played college football at Wyoming. Between 2015 and 2018, Wingard totaled 454 tackles, the second most in program history. He finished his college career tied for most tackles all-time in the Mountain West Conference.

Professional career

2019 season 
Wingard went undrafted in the 2019 NFL Draft. On April 29, 2019, the Jacksonville Jaguars signed Wingard to a three-year, $1.76 million contract that includes a signing bonus of $5,000.

On August 31, 2019, Wingard made the Jaguars final 53-man roster. In week 13 against the Tampa Bay Buccaneers, Wingard recorded a strip sack on Jameis Winston that he recovered in the 28–11 loss. This was Wingard's first career sack in the NFL.

2020 season 
Wingard was placed on the reserve/COVID-19 list by the Jaguars on August 2, 2020, and was activated from the list two days later. In Week 1 of the 2020 season against the Indianapolis Colts, Wingard recorded his first career interception off a pass thrown by Philip Rivers during the 27–20 win. He was placed on injured reserve on October 12, 2020, with an abdominal strain. He was activated on November 14, 2020.
In Week 17 against the Indianapolis Colts, Wingard recorded his second career interception off a pass thrown by Philip Rivers during the 28–14 loss.

2022 season 
On March 15, 2022, the Jaguars placed a restricted free agent tender on Wingard.

2023 season
On March 15, 2023, Wingard signed a three-year, $9.6 million contract extension with the Jaguars.

References

External links
Jacksonville Jaguars bio
Wyoming Cowboys bio

Living people
1996 births
Jacksonville Jaguars players
Wyoming Cowboys football players
American football safeties
People from Arvada, Colorado
Players of American football from Colorado
Sportspeople from the Denver metropolitan area